The Akaflieg Stuttgart fs18a was a glider designed and built in Germany from 1938. It was characterized by a gull wing and was the first glider to have a retractable undercarriage. Only one example of the design was constructed.

Development
With the experience gained from the Rhön gliding competitions, the students at Akaflieg Stuttgart (Akademische Fliegergruppe – academic flying group) designed the fs18, which was able to turn tightly in thermals and had a relatively low sink rate, over the six months preceding the next Rhön competition at Wasserkuppe. The result was the fs18 which was a high-wing cantilever monoplane with gulled centre section, to ensure that the wings joined the fuselage at 90 degrees, rectangular midsection and tapered outer section. Flaps were fitted to the trailing edge of the midsection to 30% chord, and ailerons were mounted on the trailing edges of the outer wing sections. The fuselage consisted of the cockpit pod smoothly narrowing to a boom-like rear fuselage supporting the tail unit. The main undercarriage was manually retractable into an enclosed wheel well behind the cockpit. After the first flight on 21 July 1938, testing of the fs18a continued until 7 December 1938 when the fs18 crashed, killing pilot Ernst Scheible.

Specifications

See also

References

Further reading

1930s German sailplanes
Glider aircraft
Aircraft first flown in 1938
Akaflieg Stuttgart aircraft